Belinda Jane Neal (born 10 January 1963) is a former Australian federal politician. She was a Member of the House of Representatives representing the electorate of Robertson between 2007 and 2010; and representing the state of New South Wales in the Senate from 1994 to 1998, both on behalf of the Australian Labor Party.

Early life
Neal was born in Brisbane on 10 January 1963. She graduated Bachelor of Laws from the University of Sydney, where she was president of the Students' Representative Council. Prior to entering parliament she worked as a legal officer for the Federated Ironworkers' Association of Australia from 1986 to 1987 and then as a solicitor in Gosford, New South Wales, from 1987 to 1994.

Politics
Neal joined the ALP in 1980. She was a delegate to state conference in New South Wales from 1983 and to national conference from 1984. In July 1989, aged 26, she contested ALP preselection for the federal seat of Robertson with the support of her husband, assistant ALP state secretary John Della Bosca. She lost by only four votes to veteran state MP Frank Walker.

Neal served on the Gosford City Council from 1992 to 1994. In February 1994, she was nominated by the ALP to fill the casual vacancy caused by the resignation of former senate president Kerry Sibraa. Although she was ultimately endorsed unanimously, the preselection process was controversial amid claims that her husband had unfairly interfered in the ballot. One of her competitors Franca Arena said that the preselection had "developed into a farce".

After her appointment, Neal served as a senator until her resignation on 3 September 1998 to contest the House of Representatives seat of Robertson at the 1998 general election in which she was defeated by the incumbent, Jim Lloyd of the Liberal Party.

In the 2007 federal election she was again preselected as the Labor candidate for Robertson, and won the seat in a very tight contest, claiming victory on 5 December.

She lost preselection for the seat of Robertson on 6 March 2010, to challenger Deborah O'Neill, who lost the seat in the following election. On 29 July 2010 Neal announced that she would not recontest the seat at the 2010 federal election, but did not rule out a future in politics, saying that the Labor Party still had her full support. Her husband, John Della Bosca, announced on the same day that he was resigning from the New South Wales Legislative Council to become a campaign director for the National Disability and Carers Alliance, and assist in the establishment of a national disability insurance scheme.

In 2015 Neal attempted a comeback to Robertson but was defeated in the ALP preselection by Ann Charlton who was chief of staff to O'Neill.

Incident at Iguana Joe's

In June 2008, Neal and her husband John Della Bosca were dining in a bistro called Iguana Joe's when they were reportedly involved in an incident with staff of the premises. Statements witnessed by Chris Spence, a political rival of Neal's, suggested Neal and her husband had been abusive to restaurant staff. The Premier of New South Wales, Morris Iemma, asked the New South Wales Police Force to assess the allegations, but the matter lapsed when the New South Wales Director of Public Prosecutions advised that nothing that occurred could have constituted a crime.

Expulsion from NSW Labor
On 24 July 2017, officers of the ALP NSW branch adopted the decision of the party's Internal Appeals Tribunal to expel Neal from the party, after the tribunal determined that she had engaged in "unworthy conduct" in a form of branch stacking called "walking the books", which was prohibited under Labor rules.

References

External links 
Belinda Neal, Senate biography.
 

1963 births
Living people
Lawyers from Sydney
Members of the Australian Senate for New South Wales
Members of the Australian Senate
Members of the Australian House of Representatives for Robertson
Members of the Australian House of Representatives
Australian Labor Party members of the Parliament of Australia
Women members of the Australian House of Representatives
Women members of the Australian Senate
Spouses of Australian politicians
21st-century Australian politicians
21st-century Australian women politicians
20th-century Australian politicians
20th-century Australian women politicians